The Baltimore Metros were an American basketball team based in Baltimore, Maryland that was a member of the Continental Basketball Association.

The team was previously known as the Washington Metros. During the 1978/79 season, the team moved to Utica and became the Mohawk Valley Thunderbirds.

On September 23, 1978 the Metros held a try-out camp for the upcoming season at Lake Clifton High School. The team's head coach was Larry Cannon. The Metros were affiliated with three NBA teams, the Baltimore Bullets; the Atlanta Hawks; and the Milwaukee Bucks.

Year-by-year

References

Defunct basketball teams in the United States
Basketball teams in Baltimore
Basketball teams in Maryland